Zoic Studios is an American visual effects company based in Culver City, California. They specialize in visual effects for feature films, episodic television, commercials, video games, advertising design, and interactive online media.

History 

Zoic Studios is an Emmy Award-winning  visual effects company based in Culver City, California with separate sister facilities in Vancouver, British Columbia, Canada and New York City.  It is a studio of creative artists, producers, and engineers.

Zoic Studios was founded by five partners in 2002 and began as a 15-person company working out of the Sunset Gower Studios lot. Their first project was creating visual effects for the action, western, science fiction television series Firefly.

In September 2002, they moved to  Culver City, California, and the company has grown to house 150 employees.

In 2006, Zoic founded Zoic BC, in Vancouver, British Columbia. In 2016, Zoic opened their first East Coast studio in NYC's Hell's Kitchen neighborhood.

Zoic has created visual effects for such TV shows including Sweet Tooth, Underground Railroad, For All Mankind, Superman & Lois, Mosquito Coast, WandaVision, The Right Stuff, The Haunting of Bly Manor, The Stand, Helstrom, Fargo, The Boys, Stargirl, Space Force, NOS4A2, Ozark, Amazing Stories, Godfather of Harlem, Wu-Tang: An American Saga, Good Place, Warrior, The Twilight Zone, Deadly Class, The Walking Dead, The Flash, Cloak & Dagger, Cobra Kai, The Orville, The X-Files, Zoo, When We Rise, Quarry, The Exorcist, Timeless, True Detective, Homeland, Banshee, Breaking Bad, The 100, 24, Sleepy Hollow, Sarah Connor Chronicles, Pan Am, Lucifer, Eureka, CSI, CSI Miami, Criminal Minds, Constantine, Californication, Angel, Firefly, Mad Men, Once Upon a Time, Maniac, Chilling Adventures of Sabrina, Manifest, Legion, Friends from College, Strange Angel, DC's Legends of Tomorrow, Santa Clarita Diet, Imaginary Mary, Marvel's Iron Fist, Game of Thrones, Marvel's The Defenders, Good Behavior, Future Man, The Get Down, Arrow, The 100, Hemlock Grove, Wayward Pines, The Man in the High Castle, A Series of Unfortunate Events, Homeland, Falling Skies, True Blood, V, Fringe, Buffy the Vampire Slayer and Battlestar Galactica and feature films which include Crouching Tiger, Hidden Dragon: Sword of Destiny, Avengers: Age of Ultron, Big Eyes, The Ballad of Buster Scruggs, Hot Tub Time Machine 2, Keeping Up with the Joneses, District 9, Zombieland, Spider-Man 2, The Day After Tomorrow, Van Helsing, Fast & Furious, Red and Limitless.

Zoic Labs is an advanced visualization company focused on the intersection of big data, narrative, design, and emerging technologies. They provide R&D, agile software development, UI/UX design, and consulting services for a diverse range of clients, both public and private.

References 

https://www.zoicstudios.com/work/samples/series/

External links

Visual effects companies
Companies based in Culver City, California